The Circuit of Ireland International Rally is an annual automobile rally, which was first held in 1931 making it the third oldest rally in the world. The most recent event was held in 2016.

The Circuit, as it is colloquially known, is organised by the Ulster Automobile Club and is traditionally held over the Easter holiday weekend. It normally starts and finishes in Northern Ireland, although over time the lengthy route of the event has typically included large segments in the Republic of Ireland as well. Most of the event's special stages are laid out on paved public roads that are closed to other traffic.

History

Early Years
The rally originated in 1931 as the Ulster Motor Rally. It was run from multiple starting points, in a manner similar to the Monte Carlo Rally. After several years in this format, it transitioned into a 1089-mile circuit, essentially following the Irish coastline and starting and finishing in Bangor, County Down. The Circuit was suspended during World War II (1939–1945), and again in 1948 due to fuel shortages. Further cancellations occurred in 1957, 1972, 2001 and 2007.

2007-2009
The 2007 Circuit of Ireland was cancelled as a result of continuing disputes between the organisers, the event operating company, and the sponsors. It was replaced by a series of smaller Easter holiday events arranged by the Ulster Automobile Club. These included the Easter International Rally (or, Easter Stages Rally), which was run over 12 special stages in Londonderry, Tyrone, and Donegal.

The Circuit restarted again on the Easter weekend (21–23 March) in 2008. Twenty-eight teams competed on twenty special stages, with fourteen teams finishing. The overall winner was Eamonn Boland in a Subaru Impreza S12B.

The 2009 event was run over the weekend of 11–12 April, starting in the town of Banbridge, County Down and finishing after 14 special stages in Dundalk. The overall winner was Eugene Donnelly in a Škoda Fabia WRC.

2010-2013
In 2010, the event was awarded Intercontinental Rally Challenge Supporter Event status. The event was run over the weekend 3–4 April and was based in Newry, Northern Ireland. There was a total of 15 stages including a  night stage. The event counted as a round of the Irish Tarmac Rally Championship. Derek McGarrity and co-driver James McKee won the rally in their Subaru Impreza S12B. Gareth MacHale/Brian Murphy (Ford Focus RS WRC) and Alastair Fisher/Marshall Clarke (Mitsubishi Lancer Evo 9) finished second and third respectively.

The 2012 Circuit of Ireland event hosted round three of the 2012 Intercontinental Rally Challenge., as well as Irish Tarmac Rally Championship and Northern Ireland Rally Championship stages.

In December 2012, it was announced that the 2013 rally will be cancelled due to a lack of funds, but was subsequently reinstated at a reduced scale. In the end, the event was cancelled due to bad weather.

2014-2016
Having resolved the issues the previous year, the 2014 Circuit of Ireland event rejoined the European Rally Championship for the first time since 1991. It consisted of 18 special stages covering a total of 230 km in 2 days, starting in Belfast. Finnish driver Esapekka Lappi dominated the (European Rally Championship) ahead of 2nd place Sepp Wiegand from Germany, making it a Skoda 1–2. He won by 1 minute and 50 seconds. Irishman Robert Barrable finished 3rd in their Ford Fiesta R5.
Declan Boyle won the Circuit of Ireland National Rally in his Subaru Impreza S12B WRC.
Teenage British driver Chris Ingram lead the ERC Junior Championship but crashed out handing the win to Czech driver Jan Černý. Ingram still became the youngest winner of the Colin McRae 'Flat Out' Award, handed to him by local hero Kris Meeke.

The 2015 event hosted European Rally Championship and Irish Tarmac Rally Championship rounds.

The 2016 Circuit of Ireland event hosted European Rally Championship, Irish Tarmac Rally Championship, as well as British Rally Championship rounds.

2017-2019
The 2017 event was cancelled due to funding issues, casting doubt on the event's future altogether. For the following two years attempts to resurrect the event were unfruitful.

2020-2021
After 3-year break, the rally was finally about to return to the Irish Tarmac Rally Championship calendar in tandem with Easter Stages Rally. The event, managed by Event Director Graeme Stewart and Clerk of the Course Nigel Hughes, was planned to consist of 18 Special Stages. The event was also to host European Rally Trophy series event FIA ERT Celtic Rally Trophy.

On 13 March the event was postponed in the light of the coronavirus pandemic.
 On 20 March, Motorsport Ireland issued a statement that all motorsport events are suspended until 1 June 2020. On 28 April the Tarmac Rally Organisers' Association announced that the 2020 Irish Tarmac Rally Championship is cancelled. The Circuit of Ireland event could still go ahead anyway, and the organisers - Ulster Automobile Club - promptly stated that the event is postponed, rather than cancelled, and have secured a date in November. However, on 25 June 2020 they finally announced that in the interests of public health and safety the event is cancelled.
 2021 event was also cancelled due to ongoing COVID-19 pandemic.

2022
After five years of absence, the Circuit returned to the 2022 racing calendar on Easter weekend. Officially called Wastewater Solutions Circuit of Ireland Rally 2022 was hosted by Ulster Automobile Club and promoted by the Easter Stages Ltd. The two day, 192.68 competitive kilometres event ran over 12 stages in Mid and East Antrim, with event headquarters in the Livestock Market in Ballymena. The Circuit of Ireland International Rally was the first round of the FIA Celtic Rally Trophy and well as the third round of the Irish Tarmac Rally Championship.

Winners

Multiple winners
Top drivers with most wins (>2) / most starts (>15). (As of 2022)

References

External links
 Old Circuit of Ireland website from WayBackMachine 
 Current event website
 Ulster Automobile Club
 Intercontinental Rally Challenge
 2020 FIA European Rally Trophy season

Rally competitions in the United Kingdom
Rally competitions in Ireland
Motorsport in the Republic of Ireland
Motorsport in Northern Ireland
Circuit
Circuit